Florian Eichner (born 16 December 1985 in Quedlinburg) is a German rower. He competed at the 2008 Summer Olympics.

References

External links 
 
 
 
 
 

1985 births
Living people
People from Quedlinburg
German male rowers
Olympic rowers of Germany
Rowers at the 2008 Summer Olympics
World Rowing Championships medalists for Germany
Sportspeople from Saxony-Anhalt